The 2021 Chevrolet Detroit Grand Prix (officially known as the 2021 Chevrolet Indy Detroit Grand Prix presented by Lear Corporation) was a pair of IndyCar motor races held on June 12, 2021, and June 13, 2021 at the Raceway at Belle Isle Park in Detroit, Michigan. They were the seventh and eighth races of the 2021 IndyCar Series.

Marcus Ericsson won the first race for Chip Ganassi Racing, scoring his first career victory in his third season, becoming the 7th different winner in the first 7 races. Ed Carpenter Racing's Rinus VeeKay finished second, with Pato O'Ward rounding out the podium places in third.

Pato O'Ward won the second race for Arrow McLaren SP, his second victory of the season, and his career. Team Penske's Josef Newgarden finished second, with Álex Palou rounding out the podium places in third.

Race 1 – Saturday June, 12

Entrants 

25 drivers have entered the race, including IndyCar Series debutants Jimmie Johnson (Chip Ganassi Racing) and Romain Grosjean (Dale Coyne Racing with Rick Ware Racing), with Scott McLaughlin (Team Penske).

Practice

Practice
Practice took place at 5:00 PM ET on April 17, 2021. Will Power went fastest in the practice session of the season with a time of 01:17.2768, ahead of Sebastien Bourdais and Pato O'Ward in second and third respectively.

Qualifying 
Qualifying took place at 11:10 AM ET on June 12, 2021.

Qualifying classification 

 Notes
 Bold text indicates fastest time set in session.

Race 
The race started at 3:00 PM ET on June 12, 2021.

Race classification

Championship standings after the race 

Drivers' Championship standings

Engine manufacturer standings

 Note: Only the top five positions are included.

Race 2 – June 13

Entrants 

25 drivers have entered the race, including IndyCar Series debutants Jimmie Johnson (Chip Ganassi Racing) and Romain Grosjean (Dale Coyne Racing with Rick Ware Racing), with Scott McLaughlin (Team Penske). Arrow McLaren SP driver Felix Rosenqvist was injured in Race 1, and Oliver Askew replaced him in Race 2.

Qualifying 
Qualifying took place at 9:00 AM ET on June 13, 2021.

Qualifying classification 

 Notes
 Bold text indicates fastest time set in session.

Race 
The race started at 12:00 PM ET on June 13, 2021.

Race classification

Championship standings after the race 

Drivers' Championship standings

Engine manufacturer standings

 Note: Only the top five positions are included.

References

External links 

Chevrolet Detroit Grand Prix Race 1
Chevrolet Detroit Grand Prix
Detroit Indy Grand Prix